Bill Green Lowrey (May 25, 1862 – September 2, 1947) was a U.S. Representative from Mississippi.

Early life
Bill Lowrey was born on May 25, 1862, in Kossuth, Mississippi. He attended public school and the Blue Mountain Academy in Blue Mountain, Mississippi, graduating from Mississippi College at Clinton in 1887. During 1888-9 he was a student at Tulane University, New Orleans, Louisiana.

Career
Lowrey became a professor at Blue Mountain College. In 1898 he was promoted to president of the college, a position he held until 1911 when he moved to Texas to become the president of the Amarillo Military Academy. Leaving that post in 1916, he accepted a posting as field secretary for Hillman College and Blue Mountain College until 1920, when he was appointed vice president of the Blue Mountain College, a position he held until 1921.

Lowrey was elected as a Democrat to the Sixty-seventh and to the three succeeding Congresses (March 4, 1921 - March 3, 1929), but was not renominated to the Seventy-first Congress (1929). He served as clerk of the United States Court for the Northern District of Mississippi 1929–1935.

Death
Lowrey died in Olive Branch, Mississippi, September 2, 1947 and was interred in Blocker Cemetery.

References

1862 births
1947 deaths
Democratic Party members of the United States House of Representatives from Mississippi
Heads of universities and colleges in the United States
Tulane University alumni
Mississippi College alumni
People from Alcorn County, Mississippi